Ceasa is a train station on ViaMobilidade Line 9-Emerald, located in the district of Vila Leopoldina, city of São Paulo.

History
The station was built by Fepasa in 1979, during the modernization of Jurubatuba Branch and old Sorocaba Railway, and opened on 4 April 1981, being located next to São Paulo Depots and General Warehouses Company (CEAGESP). Since 1996, the station is operated by CPTM. It was reformed and reopened on 28 March 2010.

References

Railway stations opened in 1981
1981 establishments in Brazil